Utricularia jackii is a terrestrial carnivorous plant that belongs to the genus Utricularia. It is endemic to Thailand. U. jackii grows among wet rocks at higher altitudes (around ) or sometimes in evergreen forests. It was first collected in 1927 and again in 1958. In his 1989 revision of his monograph, Peter Taylor discussed the specimen and identified it as potentially distinct, but never formally described it. John Adrian Naicker Parnell located the herbarium specimens in preparation for a review of Lentibulariaceae of Thailand and formally described it as a new species in 2005. Parnell named it in honor of his father, John "Jack" Thomas Mackie Parnell.

See also 
 List of Utricularia species

References 

jackii
Carnivorous plants of Asia
Endemic flora of Thailand
Plants described in 2005